Mechyotka is a rural locality (a selo) and the administrative center of Mechyotskoye Rural Settlement, Bobrovsky District, Voronezh Oblast, Russia. The population was 1,100 as of 2010. There are 33 streets.

Geography 
Mechyotka is located 39 km south of Bobrov (the district's administrative centre) by road. Pchelinovka is the nearest rural locality.

References 

Rural localities in Bobrovsky District